Adrian Mădălin Ionescu (born 13 July 1985 in Slatina) is a Romanian footballer who plays as a defensive midfielder, but can also take up the role of a central defender.

External links
 

1985 births
Living people
Sportspeople from Slatina, Romania
Romanian footballers
FC Argeș Pitești players
ASC Oțelul Galați players
FC Delta Dobrogea Tulcea players
CS Universitatea Craiova players
CS Sportul Snagov players
FCV Farul Constanța players
Liga I players
Liga II players
Association football midfielders